Yetur Akkub Gross-Matos (born February 26, 1998) is an American football defensive end for the Carolina Panthers of the National Football League (NFL). He played college football at Penn State and was drafted by the Panthers in the second round of the 2020 NFL Draft.

Early life and high school career
Gross-Matos was born in Atlantic City, New Jersey but grew in Fredericksburg, Virginia. When Gross-Matos was two years old, his biological father died after a boating accident while trying to rescue Yetur from drowning. When he was 10 his brother died from a lightning strike while they were playing baseball.

Gross-Matos attended Chancellor High School in Spotsylvania County, Virginia. During his high school career, he had 37 sacks. He committed to Pennsylvania State University to play college football.

College career
As a true freshman in 2017, Gross-Matos played in all 13 games and had 17 tackles and 1.5 sacks. As a sophomore in 2018, he started all 13 games and had 54 tackles and eight sacks.  After a junior year with 14 tackles for loss and 9.5 sacks, Gross-Matos decided to forgo his senior year and declared for the 2020 NFL Draft.

Statistics

Professional career

Gross-Matos was selected by the Carolina Panthers with the 38th overall pick in the second round of the 2020 NFL Draft. He was the second defensive end taken behind Chase Young.

In Week 4 against the Arizona Cardinals, Gross-Matos recorded his first career sack, a strip sack on Kyler Murray which was recovered by the Panthers, during the 31–21 win. He suffered an ankle injury in Week 5 and was placed on injured reserve on October 16, 2020. He was activated on November 7, 2020, prior to Week 9. He was placed on the reserve/COVID-19 list by the team on November 30, 2020, and activated on December 10.

NFL career statistics

References

External links

Carolina Panthers bio
Penn State Nittany Lions bio

1998 births
Living people
People from Spotsylvania County, Virginia
Players of American football from Virginia
Sportspeople from the Washington metropolitan area
American football defensive ends
Penn State Nittany Lions football players
Carolina Panthers players